A conversation tart is a type of pastry made with puff pastry that is filled with frangipane cream and topped with royal icing. The recipe was created in the late 18th century to celebrate the publication of les Conversations d'Émilie by Louise d'Épinay.

See also 
 List of pastries
 List of pies, tarts and flans

References 

French pastries
Tarts
Stuffed desserts
Puff pastry
Almond desserts